Stadionul Tineretului may refer to:
 Stadionul Tineretului (Lugoj)
 Stadionul Tineretului (Oradea)
 Stadionul Tineretului (Urziceni)
 Stadionul Silviu Ploieşteanu (previously known as Stadionul Tineretului)
 Stadionul Arcul de Triumf (also known as Stadionul Tineretului)

See also 
Tineretului (disambiguation)